This article is about the particular significance of the year 1854 to Wales and its people.

Incumbents

Lord Lieutenant of Anglesey – Henry Paget, 1st Marquess of Anglesey (until 29 April); Henry Paget, 2nd Marquess of Anglesey (from 17 May) 
Lord Lieutenant of Brecknockshire – John Lloyd Vaughan Watkins
Lord Lieutenant of Caernarvonshire – Sir Richard Williams-Bulkeley, 10th Baronet 
Lord Lieutenant of Cardiganshire – William Edward Powell (until 10 April);  Thomas Lloyd, Coedmore (from 16 September)
Lord Lieutenant of Carmarthenshire – John Campbell, 1st Earl Cawdor 
Lord Lieutenant of Denbighshire – Robert Myddelton Biddulph   
Lord Lieutenant of Flintshire – Sir Stephen Glynne, 9th Baronet
Lord Lieutenant of Glamorgan – Christopher Rice Mansel Talbot
Lord Lieutenant of Merionethshire – Edward Lloyd-Mostyn, 2nd Baron Mostyn (until 3 April); Robert Davies Pryce (from 7 May)
Lord Lieutenant of Monmouthshire – Capel Hanbury Leigh
Lord Lieutenant of Montgomeryshire – Charles Hanbury-Tracy, 1st Baron Sudeley
Lord Lieutenant of Pembrokeshire – Sir John Owen, 1st Baronet
Lord Lieutenant of Radnorshire – John Walsh, 1st Baron Ormathwaite

Bishop of Bangor – Christopher Bethell 
Bishop of Llandaff – Alfred Ollivant 
Bishop of St Asaph – Thomas Vowler Short 
Bishop of St Davids – Connop Thirlwall

Events
Late August — Third cholera pandemic in Cardiff.
31 October — David Davies (Dai'r Cantwr) receives a conditional pardon for his role in the Rebecca Riots.
5 November — At the Battle of Inkerman, Hugh Rowlands carries out the actions that lead to his becoming the first Welshman to win the Victoria Cross.
11 November — In Australia, Welsh-born John Basson Humffray is elected the first president of the Ballarat Reform League.
unknown dates
Betsi Cadwaladr volunteers to serve as a nurse in the Crimean War.
Love Jones-Parry is High Sheriff of Caernarvonshire.
The Telegraphic Despatch is published in Swansea, the first newspaper in Wales to come out more than once a week.
A penny newspaper, the Herald Cymraeg, is founded at Caernarfon, with James Evans as editor.
John Williams (Ab Ithel) becomes editor of the Cambrian Journal.

Arts and literature

New books

English language
Thomas Prichard — The Heroines of Welsh History
Samuel Prideaux Tregelles — Account of the Printed Text of the New Testament

Welsh language
John Edwards (Eos Glan Twrch) — Llais o'r Llwyn: sef Barddoniaeth, ar Amryfal Destynau
Samuel Evans (Gomerydd) — Y Gomerydd
Owen Wynne Jones — Fy Oriau Hamddenol
William Thomas (Islwyn) — Barddoniaeth

Music
David Richards — Y Blwch Cerddorol (collection of hymns and anthems)

Births
1 January — Peter Morris, baseball player (died 1884 in the United States)
8 April — Robert Arthur Williams (Berw), clergyman and poet (died 1926)
17 April — Sir John Eldon Bankes, judge (died 1946)
30 April — William Critchlow Harris, Welsh-Canadian architect (died 1913)
10 July — John Lloyd Williams, botanist and composer (died 1945)
16 December — J. D. Rees, colonial administrator (died 1922)

Deaths
14 January — Charles Rodney Morgan, politician, 25
3 April — Edward Lloyd, 1st Baron Mostyn, politician, 85
10 April — William Edward Powell, politician, 66
29 April — Henry Paget, 1st Marquess of Anglesey, soldier and politician, 85
24 May — John Rowlands of Y Llys, alleged father of Sir Henry Morton Stanley, 39
12 November — Charles Kemble, actor, 79
28 December — Rowland Williams, clergyman and writer, 75
29 December — Joseph Tregelles Price, industrialist, 70

References

 
Wales